Dietrich Wilhelm Bernhard von Jagow (29 February 1892 – 26 April 1945) was a German naval officer, politician, SA Obergruppenführer and diplomat.

Naval career
Jagow was born into a distinguished aristocratic family in Frankfurt an der Oder. Gottlieb von Jagow, who served as the German foreign minister was his cousin. Jagow ascribed to the typical Junker values of militarism, nationalism and a deep devotion to serving the state. After attending the Mürwik naval school, he joined the Imperial German Navy as an officer on 1 April 1912. During the First World War, he served on a submarine and then commanded a minesweeper after the Armistice of 11 November 1918. Jagow began the war in 1914 as a lieutenant and had risen to the rank of senior lieutenant by 1918.

Völkisch activist
In September 1919, Jagow joined the Marinebrigade Ehrhardt of the Freikorps and took part in the Kapp Putsch of March 1920. Refusing to take an oath of loyalty to the Weimar Republic, he left the Navy later in March 1920. Settling in Bavaria, he joined the right-wing terrorist group Organization Consul that assassinated pro-Weimar politicians. His first job was as a sales agent for the Bavarian Wood Processing Company, which was a front for the Organization Consul. In the fall of 1920, he joined the NSDAP and in early 1921 he joined the SA. In the spring of 1921, he fought against the Poles in Silesia. The commander of the company Jagow served in during the Silesian war was Baron Manfred von Killinger, who remained a close associate thereafter.

In January 1922, Adolf Hitler sent Jagow to set up the first NSDAP group in Tübingen, and Jagow subsequently became one of the most important Nazi leaders in Württemberg. Jagow worked as a guest lecturer at Eberhard Karls University. Jagow was also part of the management of the famous Osiander bookstore in Tübingen, a position he was able to secure as two other former naval officers who also part of the management team. In April 1922 Hitler appointed Jagow SA inspector and chief of staff for Württemberg. As a professor, Jagow used his lecture podium as a chance to preach völkisch theories to his students.

German universities were traditionally strongholds of the völkisch movement, and the university town of Tübingen was a center of völkisch activities. The Social Democratic police president of Württemberg, Hermann Schützinger, who visited Tübingen in 1926 complained the city was very much dominated by the völkisch right. Schützinger noted that everywhere he went in Tübingen he saw photographs of Adolf Hitler and Erich Ludendorff prominently displayed "next to all kinds of antisemitic Germanic kitsch spat out by the metropolis" while "stubborn small-town professors" used their lectures to indoctrinate their students in the völkisch ideology. In such a climate, Jagow found his niche in Tübingen as a professor and SA leader. On 24 June 1922, the German Foreign Minister Walther Rathenau was assassinated by the Organization Consul because he was Jewish. The subsequent police investigation into Rathenau's assassination led to Jagow being interviewed as a possible suspect, through he was never charged. However, the police investigation did establish that Jagow spent much of his time leading his students in para-military training for the Organization Consul, which appeared to be his primary duty at the university.

After the failure of the Munich Beer Putsch in November 1923, Jagow left the NSDAP, but remained active in a number of völkisch groups in Württemberg. From 1923 to 1927, he was a member of the Bund Wiking (Viking League). In 1925, he led a group of völkisch university students into a street fight with the Reichsbanner Rote-Schwartz-Gold, the paramilitary wing of the SDP. In 1927, he joined the  Stahlhelm. In 1929, he rejoined the NSDAP.  From 1929 to 1930 he was the local NSDAP group leader in Esslingen am Neckar and the managing director of the NSDAP Gau  in Württemberg.  In 1931 Jagow was appointed full-time SA group leader "Southwest", making him in charge of all SA units in southwestern Germany. Starting in 1931, Jagow was engaged in a feud with Fritz Bauer, the Social Democratic judge who served as the chairman of the Stuttgart chapter of the Reichsbanner Rote-Schwartz-Gold. As a Social Democrat, a Jew and a homosexual, Bauer personified  everything that Jagow hated. Jagow was well known as a militant anti-Semite and a devotee of the Führer principle. Jagow was elected to the Reichstag in 1932 and remained a member until 1945.

Under the Nazi Regime
Starting in March 1933, Jagow served as the commissioner of the Württemberg state police. On 8 March 1933, Jagow was appointed police commissioner by Hitler using his powers under the Reichstag fire degree as a justification. As police commissioner, Jagow started what was described as a "reign of terror", allowing the Württemberg SA to beat up Jews, Communists and Social Democrats. On a single night in March 1933, Jagow had over 200 KPD members arrested without charge. Jagow had all of the offices belonging to the KPD and the SPD in Württemberg shut down as a threat to public order. In Stuttgart, he personally led the SA in shutting down the Communist and Social Democratic offices for Württemberg. The Nazis had much more success in winning the support of German Protestants while German Catholics by and large retained their loyalty to the Zenturm. As Germany was a Protestant majority country, this electoral limitation was not an insurmountable handicap, but in Württemberg, which had a Catholic population the Nazis did not have the support of the majority of the people. The sense of being a minority made the Württemberg Nazis inclined to use violent methods to impose their will on the population.

On 23 March 1933, Jagow used his powers as police commissioner was to have the Württemberg state police arrest his archenemy Bauer in his office without charges. Jagow had a concentration camp built at Heuberg and organised the boycott of Jewish businesses in Württemberg as part of the national boycott of Jewish businesses on 1 April 1933. The Heuberg concentration camp had 1, 902 people imprisoned within its fences when it was founded in March 1933 and within nine months, the number had risen to 15, 000. Bauer was sent to the Heuberg camp, where he was beaten and humiliated by the SA guards. About 40 people who held at Heuberg died as a result of beatings by the SA guards during Jagow's time as police commissioner, a fact that he proudly noted in his reports to Berlin. The Württemberg NSDAP was torn by a feud between Gauleiter Wilhelm Murr and his rival the Minister President Christian Mergenthaler. Jagow who backed the losing side in the feud was transferred to Frankfurt am Main as leader of the SA group V. In June 1933, he was promoted to the rank of SA Obergruppenführer. During the Night of the Long Knives, Jagow was scheduled for execution by the SS, and was lucky to have survived. After the Night of the Long Knives, Jagow was transferred to Berlin, which he headed the local SA branch for Brandenburg from July 1934 to January 1942. In Berlin, Jagow was noted for his zeal in persecuting Jews. In 1935, he was elected to the Berlin city council.

In 1935, Jagow left the Evangelical Church of Württemberg, of which he had been a long-time member, saying that his belief in National Socialism was no longer compatible with membership in the Evangelical Church.   Jagow had resumed his naval career in 1933 as a reserve officer and served during the Spanish Civil War in 1936-1937 as an intelligence officer. In 1936, when the völkisch magazine Das innere Reich was banned following an article which implicitly criticized the idolisation of Frederick the Great under the Third Reich, the editors of Das innere Reich appealed to Jagow among other people for help. On 23 October 1936, the ban of  Das innere Reich was lifted following the intervention of Rudolf Hess.

In September 1939, he resumed his naval officer as an active officer, initially commanding the minesweeper Tannenberg in the Baltic Sea. Jagow was always proud to be a Junker and combined traditional Junker values with Nazism. In a letter to his son written in September 1939, Jagow encouraged him to remember the Jagow family values, which he called "the tradition of honour, loyalty, knightliness and bravery". In the same letter, Jagow told his son not to be a Duckmäuser ("moral coward") and to stay faithful to the "National Socialist idea unto death". From October 1940 to April 1941, he commanded the 18th flotilla of patrol boats, torpedo boats, and minesweepers in the English channel, leading his forces into nightly clashes with the Royal Navy for control of the channel.

In January 1941, long-standing rivalries between the Auswärtiges Amt (Foreign Office) and the SS exploded with the attempted coup d'état in Bucharest that saw SS back the coup by the Iron Guard under its leader Horia Sima against the Prime Minister, General Ion Antonescu while the Auswärtiges Amt together with the Wehrmacht back Antonescu. In the aftermath of the coup, the Foreign Minister Joachim von Ribbentrop made an effort to curb the power of the SS to conduct a foreign policy independent of the Auswärtiges Amt. Taking advantage of the long-standing rivalries between the SS and the SA, in 1941, Ribbentrop appointed an assemblage of SA men to head the German embassies in Eastern Europe, with Manfred von Killinger going to Romania, Siegfried Kasche to Croatia, Adolf-Heinz Beckerle to Bulgaria, Jagow to Hungary, and Hanns Ludin to Slovakia in order to ensure that there would be minimal co-operation with the SS. Ribbentrop that the traditional aristocratic diplomats who dominated the Auswärtiges Amt were too genteel to handle the SS, and wanted SA brawlers, whom he felt would be better in upholding the authority of the Auswärtiges Amt against the SS.

Minister plenipotentiary in Budapest
The role of the SA ambassadors was that of "quasi-Reich governors" as they aggressively supervised the internal affairs of the nations they were stationed in, making them very much unlike traditional ambassadors. The aristocratic professional diplomats who dominated the Auswärtiges Amt saw the SA ambassadors as "outsiders", the disparaging term used by the professional diplomats to describe anyone who was not part of their clique. The German historian Daniel Siemans wrote that it was significant that four of the five SA ambassadors had served as policemen in their careers, suggesting it was their ability to impose their will on others as police chiefs that led them for them being appointed as ambassadors. From the viewpoint of Berlin, southeast Europe was viewed as the ergänzungsraum ("complementary space") to the lebensraum ("living space") in Eastern Europe. Unlike the lebensraum, which was to be colonised with millions of German settlers while the indigenous peoples living there would be exterminated, expelled or enslaved, the ergänzungsraum were seen as a source of food, raw materials and manpower that would assist the Reich in its quest for "world power status". Because the states in the ergänzungsraum were not to be colonised, the role of these states were seen as essentially protectorates of Germany that would be allowed a nominal independence as long as they played their role in the "New Order in Europe". Those who knew him reported that Jagow was "deeply unhappy" about serving as a diplomat as he much preferred to be fighting in the war. Hungary was a society dominated by the Magyar nobility who owned most of the land and generally held almost all of the high offices of the Hungarian state. It was felt that Jagow as a nobleman was the best man to talk to the Magyar aristocracy, who would have resented it if the German minister was a commoner.

From 1941 to 1944, he was the German minister (ambassador) to Hungary. The Hungarian politician Count Miklós Kállay described him: "In those days I had my first meeting with the German minister , Herr Dietrich von Jagow. He was a relative nonentity, neither a politician nor a career diplomat, but an enthusiastic member of the SA". Herbert Pell, the American minister in Budapest called Jagow "in many ways a boorish little fellow". Jagow knew nothing of Hungary and did not speak Magyar, through the fact that German was widely known among the Hungarian elite to a certain extent mitigated this handicap. His almost mindless militarism as he had a deep-rooted contempt for civilians made it very difficult for him to forge friendships with civilians in Budapest. Jagow's police background did not help him as a diplomat as he was considered in Budapest to be a rude, arrogant bully who liked to push people around. Jagow's principal adviser on Hungary was the völkisch intellectual Hans Freyer who headed the German Institute for Culture in Budapest. In 1939, the Hungarian government passed a sweeping set of anti-Semitic laws intended to marginalize the Hungarian Jewish community by requiring that Jewish involvement in the professions, businesses and liberal arts be limited to 5% (the same percentage of the Hungarian population that was Jewish). Jagow complained right from the moment that he arrived in Budapest that the laws was insufficient, and the Hungarians should pass more harsher laws, saying that only allowing 0% of the people in the professions, businesses liberal arts to be Jewish would satisfy him.

As minister in Budapest, where he frequently pressured the Hungarian government to do its part in the "Final Solution of the Jewish Question". Under pressure from him, the Hungarian government increased the severity of its anti-Semitic laws and imposed the onerous labor service in the Royal Hungarian Army on Hungarian Jewish men, but refused to deport its Jews. Besides for the "Jewish Question", Jagow's main duties in Budapest were to monitor the situation in Balkans, recruit Hungarian volksdeutsche (ethnic Germans) into the Waffen-SS and to ensure that Hungary kept supplying Germany with food. Germany had far more people than German agriculture was capable of supplying, thus requiring the Reich to import food from Hungary where the rich farmlands of the Great Hungarian plain produced food in plenty. Jagow favored closer links with the Arrow Cross movement, but was generally overruled by his superiors in the Auswärtiges Amt who preferred to stay on good terms with Admiral Miklos Horthy, the Regent of Hungary.

Through Jagow had difficult relations with the SS, one of his main duties was ensure the Swabians (the term used for volksdeutsche living on the Great Hungarian Plain, so-called because most of their families originated in Swabia) and the Saxons (the term used for volksdeutsch in Transylvania, whose family histories likewise originated in Saxony) serve in the Waffen-SS instead of the Honvêd (the Royal Hungarian Army). In common with the other volksdeutsch communities in Eastern Europe, both the Swabians living on the Great Hungarian Plain and the Saxons of Transylvania had been heavily Nazified in the 1930s and many Hungarian volksdeutsche accepted the Nazi claim that their primary loyalty was to their ancestral homeland of Germany. The  Nazi Volksbund der Deutschen in Ungarn (People's League of Germans in Hungary), founded in 1938 had become the largest group in the Hungarian volkdeustche community, having between 150, 000–340, 000 members over the course of its existence. Jagow reported in November 1941 that when the Honvêd tried to call out 86 Swabians in the village of Kula, only one, a hunchback who knew the SS would reject him, reported to the recruiting office as the other 85 were already joined the Waffen-SS with the aim of fighting on the Eastern front. Contrary to their expectations, the Hungarian volksdeutsche who joined the Waffen-SS were not sent to the Eastern Front, but instead to anti-guerilla duties in the Balkans (a lowly task in the German military). As minister, Jagow was responsible for ensuring that the families of the men who joined the Waffen-SS were paid support funds, which was not paid directly from the legation, instead going through the Volksbund. As the men recruited were Hungarian citizens who in theory were supposed to serve in the Honvêd, the recruitment of the volksdeutsche were illegal under Hungarian law, leading to regular complaints to the German legation. It was only in January 1942 when Ribbentrop visited Budapest to meet the pro-German prime minister, Count László Bárdossy, that the Hungarians finally agreed to accept that the Hungarian volksdeutsch were to serve in the Waffen-SS instead of the Honvêd.

On 7 March 1942, Admiral Horthy dismissed Bárdossy as prime minister and replaced him with the Anglophile Count Miklós Kállay. Jagow did not see the change as important, writing in a report to Berlin: "Kállay is basically an apolitical person and has not been active in the last few years either in internal or foreign affairs. National Socialism is an "alien" concept to him and he bears no inner sympathy with it. Nevertheless, he will no doubt continue the same relations with Germany as his successor". Jagow reported that Kállay in his first speech as prime minister on 19 March 1942 described the war against the Soviet Union as "our war" and ordered a police crackdown on the Hungarian Social Democrats, sending hundreds of Jewish Social Democrats to the dreaded Labor Service of the Royal Hungarian Army where conditions were extremely harsh. Jagow described Kállay in his reports to Ribbentrop as a proponent of what was known in Hungary as "civilized antisemitism" who favored social exclusion and discrimination as the solution to the "Jewish Question", but who deeply deplored violence. However, in July 1942, Jagow reported to Ribbentrop that Kállay was basically loyal to alliance with Germany and his government had taken "a sharper position on the Jewish Question than all of his predecessors". In the coming months, Jagow was to find that he was wrong in his assessment of Kállay.

On 6 October 1942, Martin Luther, the diplomat in charge of the anti-Semitic polices in the Auswärtiges Amt, informed Jagow that his number one duty in Budapest was to impress upon the Hungarians that Hungary must do its part in the "Final Solution". Ribbentrop made a major push to involve Hungary on 14 October 1942 where the State Secretary of the Auswärtiges Amt, Baron Ernst von Weizsäcker, met with Döme Sztójay, the Hungarian minister in Berlin and on the same day Jagow met Count Jenő Ghyczy, the Hungarian Foreign Minister. Both Weizsäcker and Jagow made the same arguments in their respective meetings, saying the Führer was extremely unhappy with the Hungarian foot-dragging about the "Jewish Question", and that Hungary's place in the "New Order in Europe" would entirely depend upon Hitler's goodwill. To buy time, the Hungarians promised that Kállay would give a major speech on the "Jewish Question" on 22 October 1942. At a meeting on 17 October 1942 with Count Ghyczy, Jagow demanded a "radical solution" to the "Jewish Question", saying that Hungary must deport its Jewish population for "resettlement in the East" as soon as possible, a request that he was to repeat a number of times afterwards. Kállay's speech, when given, disappointed Jagow who complained the prime minister called the "Jewish Question" just one of many problems facing Hungary and called those wanted a solution "degraded men". Sztójay, who was opposed to Kállay's policy, visited Weizsäcker at his house for an informal meeting. Sztójay told Weizsäcker that Kállay could not be trusted on the "Jewish Question", saying the prime minister was far too squeamish to be involved in murder, information that Weizsäcker passed on to Ribbentrop.

On 27 October 1942, Jagow met Kállay at the prime minister's office where the meeting was extremely difficult as Jagow sought to bully Kállay. Kállay asserted that his viewpoint that Hungary would to move slowly on the "Jewish Question" as most of the middle-class people in Hungary were Jewish, answers that enraged Jagow. Jagow told Kállay that he did not understand the "Jewish Question", which he called an "international problem" involving every nation in the world, and told Kállay that his concerns about the economic impact of deporting Hungary's Jews could be easily resolved by a joint commission of Hungarian and German experts. In November 1942, Jagow again met with Kállay, who now provided another reason for delay. Kállay told Jagow that the Hungarian peasants were not anti-semitic, and if the Jews were deported, demands would be raised for Hungary to solve the problem imposed by its volksdeutsche minority. In what appeared to be an attempt at blackmail, Kállay told Jagow if he deported the Jews, he would have to close the German language schools for the Hungarian volksdeutsche and stop the Waffen-SS recruitment of Hungarian volksdeutsche. Jagow was furious with Kállay equating the Hungarian Jews with the Hungarian volksdeutsche , saying that there was no comparison between the two minorities and warned the prime minister not to close the German language schools, which he called essential to allow the Hungarian volksdeutsche to retain their deutschtum (Germanness).

In October and again in November 1942, Jagow reported to Berlin that he did not expect the Hungarian government to agree to his requests to deport Hungarian Jews to the death camps. In December 1942, Jagow received a promise that Hungary was willing to pass a law marginalize the Jewish community completely. But at the same time, his hosts noted that a disproportionate number of Hungarian middle classes were Jewish, and the effort to marginalize the Jews of Hungary should have to be undertaken slowly as otherwise the Hungarian economy would collapse. Jagow noted sourly that this statement was essentially true and that "whole sections of Hungarian society would have retrained to perform new tasks" as a result of a "radical restructuring".  Several times, he repeated the request to deport the Hungarian Jews in 1943, but was always rebuffed which damaged his standing in Berlin.

In January 1943, General József Heszlényi, the commander of the Fourth Hungarian Army fighting in the Soviet Union and General Sandor Homlok, the Hungarian military attaché in Berlin made an offer, perhaps without the knowledge of Admiral Horthy, to have all of the Jewish refugees who fled into Hungary numbering about 100, 000 expelled into Transnistria region annexed to Romania, where they would be exterminated. The American historian Randolph Braham noted that most of the Hungarian officer corps were "extreme Germanophiles" who had a blind faith in the Nazi "final victory", and it was quite possible that Heszlényi and Homlok were acting on their own.  In February 1943, Luther asked Jagow if the Hungarians were still willing to go ahead with the Heszlenyi-Homolok offer. On 18 February 1943, Jagow replied that he was not certain if Hezlenyi and Homlok were speaking on behalf of the Hungarian government or not. Jagow sent a final cable to Berlin about the Heszlenyi-Homolok offer, but Braham noted this cable is missing from the diplomatic archives of the Auswärtiges Amt as someone had destroyed it for unknown reasons.

Unknown to Jagow, the confidence of Horthy in a German victory had been badly shaken by the German defeat at the Battle of Stalingrad, which ended with the German 6th Army surrendering on 2 February 1943. The Battle of Stalingrad together with the Battle of Voronezh saw the Hungarian Expeditionary Force sent to fight in the Soviet Union almost annihilated, and after these twin military disasters, Horthy was desperately looking for a way to pull Hungary out of the war. At the same time, Horthy tried to unrealistically find a way to sign an armistice that would allow Hungary to keep all of the territory gained since 1938 at the expense of Czechoslovakia, Romania and Yugoslavia, which complicated the armistice talks. The Allies had made numerous statements to the media, accusing Nazi Germany of crimes against humanity, which caused Horthy to recognize that keeping the Hungarian Jewish population safe would improve his odds of signing an armistice with the Allies. 

In February 1943, Jagow was approached by Baron László Vay, a prominent MP of the MEP (Magyar Elet Partja-Party of Hungarian Life) about an up-coming visit of a delegation of MEP MPs led by Béla Lukács to Munich to meet Martin Bormann scheduled for 12 March 1943. Vay wanted Bormann  to pressure Lukács and the other MEP MPs at the Munich meeting to do more to resolve the "Jewish Question" in Hungary, saying "there is much to done yet in this area in Hungary". Jagow agreed to pass on Vay's message to Berlin alongside a note stating this initiative must be not revealed as coming from Vay. At the meeting in Munich, Bormann hammered the MEP MPs, saying that Hungary was not doing its part to solve the "Jewish Question", and this was going to affect Hungary's relations with Germany in general. Knowing of the Hungarian obsession with regaining all of the lands lost under the Treaty of Trianon, Bormann stated that there was a connection between the two issues, saying the Hungarians really wanted to take back all of the lost lands, then they should be willing to do their part with the "Final Solution to the Jewish Question".

Throughout 1943, Hungarian diplomats in Turkey were secretly in contact with British and American diplomats, telling them that their government no longer wished to be fighting with Germany. Turkey under the leadership of President İsmet İnönü leaned towards a pro-Allied neutrality, and the Turks often assisted with settling up meetings between diplomats from the lesser Axis nations and the Allies. Admiral Horthy and Kállay wanted to sign an armistice, but such feelings were not shared by many in the Hungarian elite, who still favored a radical solution to the "Jewish Question" at home and an alliance with Germany abroad; as a consequence, many Hungarian officials leaked information to their German counterparts. In addition, the Germans had broken the Turkish diplomatic codes, giving Berlin a "bird's eye" view of the workings of Turkish diplomacy. On 29 March 1943, Ribbentrop in a dispatch to Jagow stated that he learned from sources within the Hungarian Legation in Berlin and reading the Turkish diplomatic cables that the Hungarians were holding armistice talks with the Allies in Turkey. At an angry meeting with Kállay later the same day, Jagow accused his government of negotiating for an armistice in Turkey, and warned the Reich would not let Hungary leave the Axis.  Kállay admitted to the secret armistice talks, but claimed to have broken the talks off when the Allies insisted upon unconditional surrender. Jagow reported to Ribbentrop that he did not believe Kállay.

On 1–3 April 1943, Kállay visited Rome to meet Benito Mussolini. Jagow in a dispatch to Ribbentrop reported that rumors in Budapest was that Kállay had gone to Italy to ask about Italy, Hungary and Finland all signing a joint armistice with the Allies; rumors that were true Jagow advised Ribbentrop that Germany should consider occupying Hungary as he reported the situation was growing more "alarming" and the "negative" influences that he attributed to the Hungarian Jews were increasing by the day. This was the origin of Operation Margarethe, the German plan to occupy Hungary. Jagow also reported that the former prime minister Béla Imrédy had told him that he was willing to serve as the prime minister of a puppet German government. On 9 April 1943, Jagow again confronted Kállay about the visit to Rome of György Barcza, the former Hungarian minister to London. Barcza was a well known Anglophile and Jagow suspected (correctly) that his visit to Rome, where he contacted officials in the Vatican, had something to do with Hungary's efforts to sign an armistice. The meeting was very unfriendly, and Jagow reported to Ribbentrop that Kállay looked most uncomfortable when he confronted him about  Barcza.

A sign of worsening relations was that Jagow received an official protest that during the retreat to the river Don following the Battle of Stalingrad that the SS had massacred several battalions of Hungarian Jews serving in the Labor service of the Hungarian Army. Jagow also complained that the new defense minister, Vilmos Nagy de Nagybaczon, had issued orders to improve conditions in the Labor service. On 15 April 1943, Jagow told Admiral Horthy that he wanted to see two members of the Foreign Affairs Committee of the upper house of the Diet, Ferenc Chrorin and Aurél Egry, expelled, saying it was distasteful for him to see two men who had "Jewish blood" discuss foreign policy questions. Horthy refused under the grounds that this was a Hungarian internal matter that was of no concern to the German minister.

Ribbentrop had come to feel that Jagow had failed as minister, and in April 1943 sent Edmund Veesenmayer out to make an assessment of Hungary. Veesenmayer reported that Hungarian morale had collapsed after the Battle of Stalingrad and that vast majority of the Hungarian people wanted out of the war. On 25 May 1943, Jagow reported to Berlin that he just talked with Filippo Anfuso, the Italian minister in Budapest. Jagow stated that Anfuso had told him that he in turn had talked to Kállay, who mentioned that he was stalling for time until the Allies won the war and he would never deport the Hungarian Jewish community. When Sztójay approached Horst Wagner, who had replaced Luther, about Hungary deporting its Jews, Jagow in a dispatch on 2 June 1943 stated that he very much doubted that Sztójay was speaking on behalf of the Kállay government.

On 9 September 1943, aboard a luxury yacht in the Sea of Marmara just outside of Istanbul, the British ambassador to Turkey, Sir Hughe Knatchbull-Hugessen secretly signed an armistice with the Hungarian diplomat László Veress under which Hungarian forces would surrender to British and American forces the moment they arrived in Hungary; significantly, the secret armistice was vague about whether it also applied to Soviet forces. Colonel Hatz de Hatszegy, one of the supposed anti-Axis Hungarian officers involved in the armistice talks in Turkey was very much trusted by the American Office of Strategical Services (OSS) who gave him a radio to allow him to keep touch when he has in Budapest. The confidence shown in Colonel Hatszegy was not justified as he was a double agent who kept the Germans  well informed about the secret talks in Turkey. Furthermore, starting in November 1943, Elyesa Bazna, the Albanian valet to Knatchbull-Hugessen, started to break into his safe where the ambassador kept his most secret documents. Bazna sold the photographs of the documents to the Germans, who paid him with what turned out to be counterfeit British pounds. As a result of Bazna's espionage, everything that Knatchbull-Hugessen knew was also known in Berlin, including the secret armistice that he signed on his yacht with Veress on 9 September. Knowing of the secret armistice in Turkey, the OKW continually worked on Operation Margarethe, which it was felt might very well have to be executed in the near-future.

By March 1944, Hitler believed that Horthy was not to be trusted, had decided to occupy Hungary to prevent an armistice from being signed in much the same way that Germany occupied Italy in September 1943 when the Italians signed an armistice. On 15 March 1944, when Admiral Horthy was attending a performance of the opera Petofi, he received an urgent summons from Jagow who stated he had to meet him immediately at the German legation. When Horthy arrived, Jagow gave him a letter from Hitler saying the Fuhrer wanted to see him at the Schloss Klessheim in Austria on 18 March. In February 1944, Horthy had asked to have the Hungarian forces removed from the Eastern Front, and Hitler now insisted he wanted to discuss the matter personally. When Horthy arrived at the  Schloss Klessheim, Hitler told him that he ordered Hungary to be occupied starting the next day. Horthy agreed to continue as Regent, but Kállay was dismissed as prime minister and replaced with Sztójay. The fact that there were about 762, 000 Jews still living in Hungary at the time of the German occupation in March 1944 was seen as a failure on Jagow's part and he was replaced as minister by SS Brigadeführer Edmund Veesenmayer. The long-standing rivalry between the SA and the SS was still going strong and the SS preferred that Veesenmanyer being in charge in Hungary instead of Jagow. On 8 May 1944, Jagow returned to Berlin as he had no more duties to perform in Budapest. On 16 May 1944, the first train of Hungarian Jews left for Auschwitz as the new Sztójay government was willing to play its part in the "Final Solution". By 8 July 1944, about 437, 000 Hungarian Jews were exterminated at Auschwitz. On 1 June 1944, Jagow was told he was not longer needed at the Auswärtiges Amt.

Volkssturm leader
In September 1944 he became leader of the Volkssturmbataillon 35 of the Volkssturm (militia) in Silesia. Jagow had not enjoyed being a diplomat and welcomed the return to the military life, which he craved. His family recalled that he was noticeably more happier commanding a Volkssturm battalion in Silesia than he had ever been in Budapest. Jagow moved his family into a mansion in Gross-Münche (modern Mnichy, Poland) in the Warthegau region that had been annexed from Poland in 1939. On 21 January 1945 while fighting against the Red Army in Upper Silesia, Jagow personally knocked out 4 Soviet tanks with his panzerfaust (anti-tank rocket launcher), for which he was mentioned in dispatches. During the same action, he was badly wounded, losing one of his eyes. Despite the loss of his eye, Jagow was proud to have fought for the Führer.

He stayed in a hospital in Leipzig until March 1945 when he and his family moved to  Constance. In April 1945 he  was sent on a diplomatic mission to the Italian Social Republic, heading for the village of Fasano that served as the headquarters of the German military occupation authority in Italy. The precise orders given to Jagow by Ribbentrop have been lost. Along the way to Italy, he stopped in South Tyrol in the city of Meran (modern Merano, Italy), which had been annexed to the Reich in September 1943. On 26 April 1945, Jagow committed suicide in the house of the German ambassador to the Italian Social Republic, Rudolf Rahn, shooting himself in the head. His suicide note stated that he did not want to live in a world controlled by Jews, which is what he believed would be the situation after Germany's defeat.

Reputation today

Despite his commitment to Nazism, Jagow was posthumously "de-Nazified" with a judge in West Germany ruling on 13 February 1950 that Jagow was a "lesser offender" as the judge ruled he was not a committed Nazi and conducted himself in "an idealistic and decent way". Jagow's widow was living in dire poverty with seven children to raise, and it appears that the judge's ruling was intended to help her by allowing her to collect a widow's pension rather than being based on an objective assessment of his career.

Jagow's son, Henning, defends his father today, insisting that he was "a political idealist, naïve and relatively stubborn with regard to political developments, but at the same time a decent man, guided by Christian ethical principles, for whom morality and honor were important and who in latter years surely must had his doubts about the evils of the Nazi regime". Henning von Jagow claims that his father's suicide was an act of political protest against the Nazi regime that was consistent with the aristocratic code of honor that he professed to live by. By contrast, in Württemberg, the Land (state) where Jagow spent much of his life, he is still remembered for the "reign of terror" he launched in 1933.

References

Books and articles
 
 
 
 
 
 
 
 
 
 
 
 
 
 
 
 
 
 

1892 births
1945 suicides
People from Frankfurt (Oder)
Imperial German Navy personnel of World War I
20th-century Freikorps personnel
Sturmabteilung officers
Members of the Reichstag of the Weimar Republic
Members of the Reichstag of Nazi Germany
Kriegsmarine personnel of World War II
Ambassadors of Germany to Hungary
Nazis who committed suicide in Germany
Volkssturm personnel
Suicides by firearm in Germany